Scherrie Ann Payne (born November 4, 1944) is an American singer. Payne is best known as the third and last lead singer of the R&B/Soul vocal group The Supremes from 1973 until 1977. Because of her powerful voice and petite stature (5'2"), Payne is sometimes referred to as "the little lady with the big voice." Payne is the younger sister of singer Freda Payne. Payne continues to perform, both as a solo act and as a part of the "Former Ladies of the Supremes" (FLOS).

Biography

Glass House 
Prior to her tenure with The Supremes, Payne was the lead singer for the group Glass House. Other members included Ty Hunter (later with The Originals), Pearl Jones, and Larry Mitchell. The group signed with Invictus Records, formed by longtime Motown songwriters Eddie and Brian Holland, and Lamont Dozier, in 1969, among other popular acts of the early 1970s, including Freda Payne (who had a #1 hit in 1970 with "Band Of Gold"), and Honey Cone, who had a #1 hit with "Want Ads". In an ironic twist of fate, "Want Ads" was originally recorded by Glass House with Scherrie on lead vocals. The Payne sisters together made a new version, but did not like the song and when Honey Cone's lead vocalist Edna Wright walked by in the studio they suggested she should sing it. Unfortunately, The Glass House did not meet this same success. The group saw their biggest hit in 1969 with the Payne-led track "Crumbs Off The Table"  which managed the Billboard top 10. Between the years of 1970 and 1972, The Glass House released two albums and nine singles, including Scherrie's solo track "V.I.P." Record World ranked The Glass House as the fifth 'Top Vocal Combination Group' in their 1970 R&B Awards. However, they never really repeated the success of their first single release. They quietly disbanded in 1972, after the release of their album "Thanks, I Needed That."

The Supremes (1973–77)

As a new Supreme in an era when their popularity was waning, Payne often remained quiet during interviews with the group; mainly because four years later, reporters were still asking about Diana Ross.  When she arrived, original Supreme Mary Wilson and 1960s Supreme Cindy Birdsong were the other two members of the group. Payne contributed powerful vocals and attitude to the group, with Birdsong and Wilson backing her up very well.  Payne gained recognition for her vocals in the single "He's My Man" (which also featured vocals by Mary Wilson) and "It's All Been Said Before", both taken from the album The Supremes. An accomplished songwriter, Payne was never able to write any special material for The Supremes, which reportedly disappointed her.

Payne began to realize that Motown did not really care as much about The Supremes as they had in the past, due to the changing musical tastes of the era and due to the fact that they were working to further the solo career of Diana Ross.  Payne's contributions did enable The Supremes to enter the disco era, however, with such dance hits as "I'm Gonna Let My Heart Do The Walking" from the album High Energy, "You're My Driving Wheel", "Let Yourself Go", and "Love I Never Knew You Could Feel So Good".  While each of these disco gems landed in the Billboard Dance Top Ten,  they did not perform as well on the pop and R&B charts.  The single "I'm Gonna Let My Heart Do The Walking"   was a #3 hit on the Disco charts, rose in the Billboard Top 40 to #25 on the R&B chart, and #40 on the Pop chart. The final three Supremes (Scherrie, Mary and Susaye Greene) officially disbanded in 1977 with a farewell concert in London, with Supremes founding member Mary Wilson announcing that she would embark on a solo career.  Motown decided to officially retire The Supremes, so Payne and Greene recorded an album together on the Motown label, Partners, under the name "Scherrie and Susaye" in 1979.  The album received mixed reviews and the two decided to part in order to embark on solo projects. Prior to the release of Partners, Payne released a solo single for Motown called "Fly" b/w "When I Look at Your Face"   in late 1977.

Former Ladies of the Supremes

In 1986, Payne joined former Supremes Jean Terrell and briefly, Cindy Birdsong, to form The Former Ladies Of The Supremes or FLOS. When Cindy left to pursue an acting career, Lynda Laurence took her place and they renamed themselves "Jean, Scherrie, & Lynda of the Supremes", recording the excellent single "We're Back', featuring Ali-Ollie Woodson from The Temptations. Throughout the 1980s and the 1990s, they traveled the world upholding The Supremes' legacy.  When Terrell departed, the group continued with Laurence's sister Sundray Tucker, who like Lynda was a former member of Stevie Wonder's back-up group, Wonder Love, and this lineup worked prolifically with British record producer Steve Weaver, resulting in a catalogue of 40 new recordings, some of them re-recordings of the Supremes' original hits. Payne and Laurence continued to tour under the FLOS name with third new member Freddi Poole, who joined the group in 1996 replacing Sundray Tucker. In 2000, Payne and Laurence backed Diana Ross on the Return To Love Supremes reunion tour, in which Diana allowed each of them to lead one of the classic Supremes songs. The FLOS celebrated their 20th anniversary in 2006 (with Cindy Birdsong, Sundray Tucker and Susaye Greene in the audience), and around this time began using the group name "Scherrie & Lynda of The Supremes". In September 2009, Joyce Vincent, formerly of Tony Orlando & Dawn, joined Scherrie and Lynda in the group, replacing Freddi Poole. Then in 2017 Lynda Laurence left the group after 32 years, and was replaced by 1970s Supreme Susaye Greene. The group (now consisting of Payne, Greene, and Vincent) was renamed "Scherrie & Susaye, Formerly of The Supremes".

Solo work
As a solo artist, in addition to "V.I.P.", which she recorded while a member of the group Glass House and was featured on their second album, Payne has had club hits, such as a cover version of 10cc's "I'm Not In Love"   (featuring sister Freda Payne and former Supreme Mary Wilson on backing vocals) in 1982, followed two years later by "One Night Only", a song from Act II of the play and movie "Dreamgirls", which is a show based loosely on the history of the Supremes and the advancing of the Motown sound into the Disco era. The 12" Megatone Label Disco Single also featured former Supreme Cindy Birdsong on background vocals. Both songs were produced by Rick Gianatos with whom Payne currently records. In 1986 Payne recorded a solo album for Superstar International Records which contained several duets with Phillip Ingram. The following year, Payne signed with British producer Ian Levine for his Motown reunion project, Motorcity Records.  While with Ian, Payne released two solo singles "Chasing Me Into Somebody Else's Arms"  (which was originally recorded in 1979 with Levine and Gianatos) and "Pure Energy"   (co-written by Payne and released on Nightmare Records), as well as covers of two Diana Ross tunes, "Ain't No Mountain High Enough" and "I'm Still Waiting".  Other product recorded for Motorcity included "Who's Wrong, Who's Right"; "Hit & Miss"; and "One More Time."

Later career
In August 2001 Payne was invited to perform at the annual prestigious open-air festival Sunset Junction Street Fair in Los Angeles.  She performed a dynamic and versatile set that showcased her talents perfectly, including Supremes' classics such as "Stoned Love" and "My World Is Empty Without You" in addition to a couple of her own solo hits, "I'm Not In Love" and "Another Life From Now". She made a return visit to Sunset Junction the following year, performing a similar set. On January 14, 2007, Payne was the special guest star at the "If My Friends Could See Me Now" fund-raiser in Los Angeles, California.  She performed her previous hit "One Night Only", from the musical Dreamgirls.  Backing her were long-time friends Pam Vincent and Joyce Vincent Wilson, both formerly of Tony Orlando and Dawn. In 2012 Payne (along with longtime producer Rick Gianatos) recorded and released a fresh new version of The Supremes hit "Let Yourself Go" along with an accompanying video. In late 2013 Payne lent her vocals to Pattie Brooks single "I Like The Way You Move." And in 2014 she can be seen in the accompanying video as one of the judges.  On July 5, 2014, Ms. Payne, along with Susaye Greene performed at the Sheraton in Los Angeles a concert program based on their album "Partners" which was released by Motown in 1979.  They were featured in the magazine Daeida, with a beautiful photo shoot.  The article chronicled career highlights with the Supremes and separately and the re-release of their "Partners" album on CD.

Personal life

in the early 1970's, Scherrie dated songwriter Lamont Dozier. Later, she dated Ronnie Phillips, producer and owner of the Dangerous Records label. Together they have one daughter, Shoshanna Payne-Phillips . Phillips died in November, 2003.

Discography

Albums
With The Glass House

With The Supremes

With the Former Ladies of the Supremes

as lead artist

Singles

with The Glass House

with The Supremes

1 Both sides features lead vocal by Mary Wilson.
2 Lead vocals by Scherrie Payne and Susaye Greene.
3 Lead vocal by Susaye Greene.
4 Lead vocal by Mary Wilson.
5 Leads vocal by Mary Wilson and Scherrie Payne.

as lead and featured artist

Collaborations
Over the years Scherrie has loaned her unique and stunning vocals as backing vocalist to many established performers, including her sister Freda Payne, on the following listed albums: 
Supernatutal High - Freda Payne (Scherrie appears alongside her sister on the song "Storybook Romance", which she composed; Scherrie recorded this herself a year later for the Partners album with Susaye Greene)
An Evening With Freda Payne: Live In Concert - Freda Payne
It's Your Night - James Ingram
Bickram's Lounge - Bickram Choudray
Late at Night - Billy Preston
Light Up Your Night - The Brothers Johnson
Calling - Noel Pointer

Songwriting
For the past four decades Scherrie has also been a songwriter and composer.  She has composed a musical entitled Ten Good Years, from which the song "Another Life from Now" was taken; the song features on the Partners album and remains a staple part of Scherrie's rare solo concerts. Songs she has composed or contributed to include:
"Now Is the Time to Say Goodbye" (written for and recorded by her sister Freda Payne)
"Storybook Romance"
"Leaving Me Was the Best Thing You've Ever Done" (co-written by Payne and Susaye Greene and included on their album Partners)
"I Found Another Love"
"You've Been Good to Me"
"Another Life from Now"
"Pure Energy"
"Who's Wrong, Who's Right"
"Don't Rock My World"
"Keep On Loving Me"
"Sisters United (We're Taking Control)"
"Light the World (With the Flame of Love)" (co-written by FLOS member Lynda Laurence)
"Crumbs Off the Table"
"The Fox"
"Hotel"
"Horse and Rider"
"Let It Flow"
"Hit and Miss"
"Your Love (Keeps Lifting Me)"

References

External links

"Scherrie & Lynda - Formerly of The Supremes"
Record Label Site

1944 births
Living people
African-American women singers
American women singers
Motown artists
American hi-NRG musicians
The Supremes members
Musicians from Detroit
American women in electronic music